The 2004 UEFA European Under-17 Championship was the third edition of UEFA's European Under-17 Football Championship. France hosted the championship, during 4–15 May. Host France defeated Spain in the final to win the competition for the first time.

Squads

Qualifying
There were two qualifying rounds.

Match Officials 
A total of 6 referees, 8 assistant referees and 2 fourth officials were appointed for the final tournament.

Referees
 Christoforos Zografos
 Modou Sowe
 Joeri Van De Velde
 Radek Matejek
 Marek Mikolajewski
 Marijo Strahonja

Assistant referees
 Simon Lee Evans
 Zaza Menteshashvili
 Erik Bergsten
 Alessandro Griselli
 Vytautas Simkus
 Nikolay Petrov
 Luleseged Begashaw
 Toni Gligorov

Fourth officials
 Olivier Thual
 Fredy Fautrel

Group stage

Group A

Group B

Knockout stage

Semifinals

Third Place Playoff

Final

References

External links
UEFA.com
RSSSF.com

 
UEFA
UEFA
UEFA European Under-17 Championship
International association football competitions hosted by France
UEFA European Under-17 Championshi
UEFA European Under-17 Championshi